Gyrinus sericeolimbatus, is a species of whirligig beetle found in India, Sri Lanka, New Guinea, Philippines, Solomon Islands.

References

Gyrinidae
Insects of Sri Lanka
Insects described in 1883